Barnes Creek is a  long 3rd order tributary to the Uwharrie River, in Montgomery County, North Carolina.

Variant names
According to the Geographic Names Information System, it has also been known historically as:  
Barns Creek

Course
Barnes Creek rises on the West Fork Little River divide about 2 miles southwest of Pisgah in Randolph County, North Carolina.  Barnes Creek then flows southwest to meet the Uwharrie River about 1.5 miles north of Uwharrie.

Watershed
Barnes Creek drains  of area, receives about 47.5 in/year of precipitation, has a topographic wetness index of 343.93 and is about 81% forested.

See also
List of rivers of North Carolina

References

Rivers of North Carolina
Rivers of Montgomery County, North Carolina
Rivers of Randolph County, North Carolina